Amherst Street may refer to:

Amherst Street (Kolkata), a neighborhood in northern Kolkata, India
Amherst Road (former name of Kyaikkhami Road), a road in Moulmein (now Mawlamyine)
Amherst Street (Montreal), a street in Montreal
Amherst Street (New York), a street in New York:
Amherst Street (Metro Rail), a Metro Rail station at the north end of Buffalo, New York